Nāropā (Prakrit; ,  Naḍapāda or Abhayakirti)  or Abhayakirti was an Indian Buddhist Mahasiddha. He was the disciple of Tilopa and brother, or some sources say partner and pupil, of Niguma. As an Indian Mahasiddha, Naropa's instructions inform Vajrayana, particularly his six yogas of Naropa relevant to the completion stage of anuttarayogatantra.
He was also one of the gatekeepers of Vikramashila monastery which is located in Bihar.

Although some accounts relate that Naropa was the personal teacher of Marpa Lotsawa, other accounts suggest that Marpa held Naropa's lineage through intermediary disciples only.

Names
According to scholar John Newman, "the Tibetans give Nāro's name as Nā ro pa, Nā ro paṇ chen, Nā ro ta pa, and so forth. The manuscript of the Paramarthasaṃgraha preserves a Sanskrit form Naḍapāda (Paramarthasaṃgraha 74). A Sanskrit manuscript edited by Tucci preserves an apparent Prakrit form Nāropā, as well as a semi-Sanskritic Nāropāda (Tucci 1930:150 & 152)." "Nāro" appears to be a nickname, meaning "Man:" nāra > vernacular nom. sing. nāro > nāropādāḥ > vernacular nāropā. Tibetan sources also hold that Nāropāda is identical to Yaśobhadra (Tib. sNyan grags bzang po), "the Great Kashmiri" (bṛhatkāśmīra; kha che chen po), the named author of the Vajrapadasārasaṃgraha, which survives in the original Sanskrit.

Dates
Herbert V. Guenther dated Nāropāda to 1016–1100 CE. These dates are based upon Guenther's misunderstanding of dates appearing in the late Tibetan hagiography he translated. These dates are impossible because, e.g., they would make Nāropāda a young man when Atiśa went to Tibet. Turrell V. Wylie argued Nāropā lived 956–1040 CE. John Newman followed Wylie and offered supporting evidence for dating Nāropāda's death to circa 1040 CE, but pointed out that the date for Nāropāda's birth derives from Tibetan sources that calculate dates in the Tibetan element-animal sexagenary cycle chronology, which was never used in India, and he concludes that Wylie's date for Nāropāda's birth is uncertain. Newman observes: "As a rule we must be very skeptical of the miraculously precise dates late Tibetan sources provide for events that occurred hundreds of years earlier in India."

Biography
Nāropāda's life story has mainly been represented based upon Tibetan hagiographies (rnam thar), the most detailed of which date to centuries after Nāropāda's lifetime. These hagiographies are filled with miracle stories and they sometimes contradict one another, making the extraction of history from them very difficult. The study of Nāropāda's own writings in their own right – independent of later Tibetan interpretations – remains in its infancy.

Naropa was born into a Shunri family of Bengal and was a contemporary of Atiśa. Another account is that he was born into a   Kashmiri brahmin family. His occupation was selling wood. From an early age showed an independent streak, hoping to follow a career of study and meditation. Succumbing to his parents' wishes, he agreed to an arranged marriage with a young Brahmin girl. After 8 years they both agreed to dissolve their marriage and become ordained. At the age of 28 Naropa entered the famous Buddhist University at Nalanda where he studied both Sutra and Tantra. He gained the reputation of a great scholar and faultless debater, essential at that time as the tradition of debate was such that the loser automatically became a student of the winner. He eventually gained the title "Guardian of the Northern Gate", engaged in many debates and taught and won many students.

According to his Tibetan namtar, or spiritual biography, one day, while he was studying, a dakini appeared to Naropa and asked if he understood the words of the Dharma, the Buddha's teachings. He replied that he did and when she seemed happy with his response, he added that he also understood their meaning. At this point the dakini burst into tears, stating that he was a great scholar, but also a liar, as the only one who understood the teachings was her brother, Tilopa. On hearing the name "Tilopa", he experienced an intense feeling of devotion, and Naropa realised he needed to find the teacher to achieve full realisation. He abandoned his studies and position at the university and set out to find Tilopa. Naropa then underwent what is known as the twelve minor hardships in his quest to find his teacher, all the hardships being hidden teachings on his path to enlightenment. When he finally met Tilopa, he was given the four complete transmission lineages which he then began to practice. While studying and meditating with Tilopa, Naropa had to undergo a further twelve major hardships, trainings to overcome all the obstacles on his path, culminating in his full realisation of mahāmudrā. Naropa spent a total of twelve years with Tilopa. At the bank of the Bagmati river, in the precint of the Pashupatinath Temple, there is the cave where he was initiated by Tilopa and attained Siddhi.

Later in his life Naropa stayed in Phullahari, where he died aged 85. Phullahari or Pullahari was located most likely in eastern Bihar or Bengal.

One of the few reliable historical accounts of him comes from a Tibetan translator named Ngatso Lotsawa, who made an effort to visit Naropa at the monastery of Phullahari while waiting to visit with Atiśa at Vikramashila:

Legacy
Naropa is remembered for his trust and devotion to his teacher, which, according to his biography, enabled him to attain enlightenment in one lifetime.

He is also remembered as part of the "Golden Garland", meaning he is a lineage holder of the Kagyu school of Tibetan Buddhism and was considered an accomplished scholar. A great practitioner, Naropa is best known for having collated the Six Dharmas. These practices help achieve Buddhahood more rapidly. Many subsequent Karmapas have been particularly adept at one or more of these practices, which in Vajrayana tradition are held to have been given by the Buddha and were passed on through an unbroken lineage via Tilopa to Naropa, Marpa and Milarepa and on to the present day. 

Naropa is considered one of the eighty-four mahasiddhas, the 'saints' of Vajrayana. Naropa University in Colorado, USA was named in his honour.

See also
Six yogas of Naropa

Marpa
Kagyu

References

Further reading
The Life and Teaching of Naropa by Herbert V Gunther. Shambhala Publications 1999 Massachusetts. 
The Life of Marpa the Translator, Seeing Accomplishes All. Tsang Nyon Heruka Translated by the Nalanda Translation Committee. Shambhala Publications 1995 Boston.  (pbk.)
The Life Story of Naropa by Kenpo Chodrak Rinpoche. Published in Kagyu Life International No's 3 & 4,1995 San Francisco.
The Golden Kagyu Garland, A History of the Kagyu Lineage, adapted by Bruce Tarver. Published in Buddhism Today Issue 15, 2005
2nd Dalai Lama. Tantric Yogas of Sister Niguma, Snow Lion Publications, 1st ed. U. edition (May 1985),  (10),  (13)
 Naropa  by Satyananda Giri. Strategic Publishing Group, 2011. 
 

11th-century Buddhists
Bodhisattvas
Indian scholars of Buddhism
History of Tibet
Kagyu lamas
Mahasiddhas
Indian Buddhist monks
Monks of Vikramashila
Buddhist yogis
11th-century Indian philosophers
11th-century Indian monks
History of Tibetan Buddhism